Rupert Renorden Sandilands (7 August 186820 April 1946) was an English international footballer who played as an outside left.

Early and personal life
Sandilands was born on 7 August 1868 at the vicarage in Denford, near Thrapston in Northamptonshire, where his father Percival was the vicar. He was the youngest of six children. By 1881 the family was living at Lyvdene School in Devon, where his father was schoolmaster.

Sandilands attended Westminster School. He worked in London as a clerk for the Bank of England. In addition to his football career, he also played hockey and cricket.

Football career
Sandilands played football whilst attending Westminster School, and played club football for Old Westminsters, Casuals, Corinthian and Ealing.

He earned five caps for the English national side between 1892 and 1896, scoring three goals. His first appearance for England was against Wales in March 1892; he scored England's second goal in a 2–0 victory. He had previously played for an England XI against Canada in a match not regarded as an official international.

Later life and death
Sandilands had retired from the Bank of England by 1939. He was living in Lewes and died in Southampton on 20 April 1946, aged 77.

References

1868 births
1946 deaths
English footballers
England international footballers
Old Westminsters F.C. players
Casuals F.C. players
Corinthian F.C. players
Association football outside forwards
People educated at Westminster School, London